The Ligurian regional election of 1985 took place on 12 May 1985.

Events
The Italian Communist Party was again the largest party, ahead of Christian Democracy. resulted narrowly ahead of the Italian Communist Party. However, after the election, incumbent President Rinaldo Magnani of the Italian Socialist Party formed a new government with the Christian Democrats and its centrist allies (Pentapartito).

Results

Source: Ministry of the Interior

1985 elections in Italy
Elections in Liguria